Gerethes Cleucir Souza da Silva (born 15 August 1990), known by his nickname Itaqui, is a Brazilian football player currently playing for Luverdense as right back.

Personal life
Gerethes came from a family who has tradition in playing football. He has two uncles who played football, Jesus Cleiton Pereira da Silva and Odacir Pereira da Silva, and all of them are nicknamed Itaqui.

References

External links

1990 births
Living people
Brazilian footballers
Sociedade Esportiva e Recreativa Caxias do Sul players
Botafogo Futebol Clube (SP) players
Clube 15 de Novembro players
Grêmio Esportivo Glória players
Esporte Clube Pelotas players
Esporte Clube Avenida players
Guarany Futebol Clube players
Luverdense Esporte Clube players
Association football defenders